Sorich may refer to:

 Michael Sorich
 Bruno Sorich
 Sorich Park